Man with a Plan, is an American sitcom series created by Jackie and Jeff Filgo and starring Matt LeBlanc. The series premiered on October 24, 2016, on CBS.  

On May 10, 2019, the series was renewed for a fourth season, which premiered on April 2, 2020. In May 2020, the series was canceled after four seasons.

Series overview

Episodes

Season 1 (2016–17)

Season 2 (2017–18)

Season 3 (2019)

Season 4 (2020)

Ratings

Season 1

Season 2

Season 3

Season 4

References

External links
 

Man with a Plan